FaithWay Baptist College of Canada is a private Baptist Bible college in Ajax, Ontario, Canada.

History
It was founded in 1983 by Dr. Robert D. Kirkland and Dr. James O. Phillips, and officially recognized by the province of Ontario as a private university under the FaithWay Baptist College of Canada Act, 1991.

Status
In 1991, the Ontario legislature officially recognized the seminary as a degree-granting institution through the passage of "An Act to Incorporate FaithWay Baptist College of Canada Act, 1991".

Governance
The seminary is governed by a board of trustees, roughly half of which is made up of members and officials of the FaithWay Baptist Church, and a Senate composed of the faculty, school administrators and several trustees.

Academic programs

Programs include:
 Certificate of Biblical Studies
 Graduate of Theology Diploma
 Bachelor of Theology Degree – Church Administration
 Bachelor of Theology Degree – Missions
 Bachelor of Religious Education Degree – Church Administration
 Bachelor of Religious Education Degree – Missions
 Bachelor of Religious Education Degree – Church Ministries
 Bachelor of Religious Education Degree – Music
 Bachelor of Religious Education Degree – Christian Day School
 Bachelor of Sacred Music Degree

References

External links

Colleges in Ontario
Baptist seminaries and theological colleges in Canada